The 1985 Brabantse Pijl was the 25th edition of the Brabantse Pijl cycle race and was held on 31 March 1985. The race started in Sint-Genesius-Rode and finished in Alsemberg. The race was won by Adri van der Poel.

General classification

References

1985
Brabantse Pijl